Total Club Hits is a compilation album released on June 10, 2008.  This is the first album in the Total Club Hits series.

Track listing

All of the tracks included in this album were mixed by DJ Skribble and DJ Slynkee.

References 

2008 compilation albums
Dance music compilation albums